The Franco-German Brigade is a special military brigade of the Eurocorps, founded in 1989, jointly consisting of units from both the French Army and the German Army.

History
The Brigade was formed in 1987 following a summit between President Mitterrand of France and Chancellor Kohl of Germany. The Brigade became operational on October 2, 1989, under the command of General Jean-Pierre Sengeisen. Currently, the FGB is stationed at Müllheim, Metz, Donaueschingen, Illkirch-Graffenstaden, Sarrebourg, and Stetten am Kalten Markt as part of the Eurocorps.

In February 2009 it was announced that a German battalion of the force was to be moved to Illkirch near Strasbourg, the first time a German unit had been stationed in France since the German occupation of World War II.

On 31 October 2013, France announced that in 2014 it would inactivate the 110th Infantry Regiment based in Donaueschingen and thus withdraw around 1000 men from Germany. This would leave the brigade with 4000 men, but would put an end to each country having a major presence in the other, France would be left with ~500 troops in Germany and vice versa.

Since 2016, French units are part of 1st Division and German units are part of 10th Panzer Division.

Organisation

The Franco-German brigade can be described as a mechanised formation; its combat units are an armoured reconnaissance regiment, three infantry battalions, and an artillery regiment. The logistical support unit and the brigade's HQ have mixed complements drawn from both countries.

  Staff, in Müllheim (D)
  3e Régiment de Hussards (3e RH) (3rd Hussar Regiment), barracks Séré-de-Rivières in Metz (F)
 1st Reconnaissance Company
 2nd Reconnaissance Company
 3rd Reconnaissance Company
 4th Light Reconnaissance and Anti-Armour Company
 5th Supply and Support Company
 6th Combat Service Support Company
  1 Régiment d'Infanterie (1 RI) - Infantry Regiment in Sarrebourg (F)
 1st Infantry Company
 2nd Infantry Company
 3rd Infantry Company
 4th Reconnaissance and Combat Support Company
 5th Supply and Support Company
 6th Combat Service Support Company
  Jägerbataillon 291 (291st Light Infantry Battalion), in Illkirch-Graffenstaden (F)
 1st HQ & Supply Company
 2nd Light Infantry Company
 3rd Light Infantry Company
 4th Reconnaissance Company
  Jägerbataillon 292 (292nd Light Infantry Battalion), in Donaueschingen (D)
 1st HQ & Supply Company
 2nd Light Infantry Company
 3rd Light Infantry Company
 4th Light Infantry Company
 5th Heavy Infantry Company (8x 120mm Mortars, and 8x TOW Anti-Tank, 8x MK20 Fire Support and 6x Reconnaissance Wiesel Armoured Weapons Carriers)
 6th Combat Service Support Company
  Artilleriebataillon 295 (295th Artillery Battalion), in Stetten am kalten Markt (D)
 1st HQ & Supply Battery
 2nd Self-Propelled Howitzer Artillery Battery with PzH 2000
 3rd Self-Propelled Howitzer Artillery Battery with PzH 2000
 4th Rocket Artillery Battery with MLRS
 5th Target Acquisition Battery with radars (COBRA), UAV (KZO) and weather platoon.
 6th basic training company
  Panzerpionierkompanie 550 (550th Armoured Engineer Company), in Stetten am kalten Markt (D)
   Logistic Battalion, in Müllheim (D)
 1st HQ & Supply Company (bi-national)
 2nd Supply Company (bi-national)
 3rd Maintenance Company (bi-national)
 4th Transport Company (German)
 Combat Service Support Company (French)
 Staff Company Franco-German Brigade (bi-national)

See also
 1st Parachute Chasseur Regiment
 Combined Joint Expeditionary Force (CJEF)
 Eurocorps
 Franco-British Defence and Security Cooperation Treaty and Downing Street Declaration
 French Foreign Legion
 List of French paratrooper units
 NATO
European army

References 

 See also article in International Defence Review, November 1994.

External links

 Deutsch-Französischen Brigade at Bundeswehr.de 
 The Franco-German brigade and the pilot unit of a proposed Single Eu27pean regiment of a European Army.

Brigades of France
Brigades of the Bundeswehr
Multinational army units and formations
Infantry brigades of Germany
France–Germany military relations
Military units and formations established in 1989